Hugo André Rodrigues Seco (born 17 June 1988) is a Portuguese professional footballer who plays for Académica de Coimbra as a winger.

Club career
Born in Lousã, Coimbra District, Seco represented four clubs as a youth, finishing his development with Associação Académica de Coimbra after signing in 2004. He spent his first seven seasons as a senior in lower league or amateur football, including two with Sport Benfica e Castelo Branco and one in the Maltese First Division with the St. Lawrence Spurs.

Seco returned to Académica on 4 July 2014, thus moving straight to the Primeira Liga. He made his debut in the competition on 10 January of the following year, coming on as a 78th-minute substitute in a 2–2 home draw against F.C. Paços de Ferreira.

On 12 July 2016, after suffering top-flight relegation, Seco signed a one-year deal with PFC Cherno More Varna. On 31 January 2017 he left Bulgaria and returned to his homeland, joining C.D. Feirense.

Seco moved to FC Irtysh Pavlodar of the Kazakhstan Premier League on 23 July 2018, leaving the club the following January by mutual consent.

References

External links

Portuguese League profile 

1988 births
Living people
People from Lousã
Portuguese footballers
Association football wingers
Primeira Liga players
Liga Portugal 2 players
Segunda Divisão players
Anadia F.C. players
Académico de Viseu F.C. players
Sport Benfica e Castelo Branco players
C.D. Fátima players
Associação Académica de Coimbra – O.A.F. players
C.D. Feirense players
S.C. Farense players
First Professional Football League (Bulgaria) players
PFC Cherno More Varna players
Kazakhstan Premier League players
FC Irtysh Pavlodar players
Nemzeti Bajnokság I players
Kisvárda FC players
Portuguese expatriate footballers
Expatriate footballers in Malta
Expatriate footballers in Bulgaria
Expatriate footballers in Kazakhstan
Expatriate footballers in Hungary
Portuguese expatriate sportspeople in Malta
Portuguese expatriate sportspeople in Bulgaria
Portuguese expatriate sportspeople in Kazakhstan
Portuguese expatriate sportspeople in Hungary
Sportspeople from Coimbra District